"Kele Kele Love" is a song by Nigerian singer Tiwa Savage, released as the lead single from her debut studio album Once Upon a Time (2013).

Background 
In an interview with Showtime Celebrity, Savage said she had doubts about the song's longevity. She spoke about the song's composition, saying, "I think issues are universal. Even though Kele Kele is Nigerian, it's something that anyone can easily know because it's universal." Savage also said the song is a mixture of her experience and the experiences of others.

Music video
The accompanying music video for "Kele Kele Love" was shot and directed in Los Angeles by Jerry Chan. It was co-directed by Tiwa Savage and Tee Billz. The music video was uploaded to her Vevo account on April 6, and to her YouTube account on July 28, 2011.

Accolades
"Kele Kele Love" won Best R&B Soul Song at the 2011 Afrotainment Museke Online Music Awards. It earned Tiwa Savage a nomination for the Next Rated award at The Headies 2011. The music video for "Kele Kele Love" was nominated for Most Gifted Female Video at the 2011 Channel O Music Video Awards. It was also nominated for Best Use of Choreography at the 2011 Nigeria Music Video Awards (NMVA).

Track listing, covers, and remixes
"Kele Kele Love" was remixed by The Busy Twist, a production duo from London that describes their music as "African-influenced bass music". The duo's version of "Kele Kele Love" is a mixture of Afropop and funk. DJ Sean, Sym 19, Shimzie, Dowty Ebi, and radio personality N6 released their own rendition of the song. "Kele Kele Love" was also remixed over a house instrumental.

Video release history

References

2010 singles
2010 songs
Tiwa Savage songs
Song recordings produced by Harmony Samuels
Songs written by Tiwa Savage
Mavin Records singles